The Stayers Stakes (Japanese ステイヤーズステークス) is a Grade 2 horse race for Thoroughbreds aged three and over run in December over a distance of 3,600 metres at Nakayama Racecourse.

It was first run in 1967 and was promoted to Grade 3 in 1984. The Stayers Stakes became a Grade 2 race in 1997.

Winners since 2000

Earlier winners

 1984 - Kane Kuroshio
 1985 - Hokkai Pegasus
 1986 - See Nan Lady
 1987 - Mount Nizon
 1988 - Slew O Dyna
 1989 - Slew O Dyna
 1990 - Doctor Spurt
 1991 - Meisho Vitoria
 1992 - Ayrton Symboli
 1993 - Ayrton Symboli
 1994 - Air Dublin
 1995 - Stage Champ
 1996 - Sage Wells
 1997 - Mejiro Bright
 1998 - Inter Flag
 1999 - Painted Black

See also
 Horse racing in Japan
 List of Japanese flat horse races

References

Turf races in Japan